Ann Arbor is a city in the U.S. state of Michigan and the county seat of Washtenaw County.  The 2020 census recorded its population to be 123,851, making it the fifth-largest city in Michigan. It is the principal city of the Ann Arbor Metropolitan Statistical Area, which encompasses all of Washtenaw County. Ann Arbor is also included in the Greater Detroit Combined Statistical Area and the Great Lakes megalopolis, the most populated and largest megalopolis in North America.

Ann Arbor is home to the University of Michigan. The university significantly shapes Ann Arbor's economy as it employs about 30,000 workers, including about 12,000 in the medical center. The city's economy is also centered on high technology, with several companies drawn to the area by the university's research and development infrastructure.

Ann Arbor was founded in 1824, named after the wives of the village's founders, both named Ann, and the stands of bur oak  trees. The city's population grew at a rapid rate in the early to mid-20th century.

History

The lands of present-day Ann Arbor were part of Massachusetts's western claim after the French and Indian War (1754–1763), bounded by the latitudes of Massachusetts Bay Colony's original charter, to which it was entitled by its interpretation of its original sea-to-sea grant from The British Crown. Massachusetts  ceded the claim to the federal government as part of the Northwest Territory after April 19, 1785.

In about 1774, the Potawatomi founded two villages in the area of what is now Ann Arbor.

Ann Arbor was founded in 1824 by land speculators John Allen and Elisha Walker Rumsey. On May 25, 1824, the town plat was registered with Wayne County as "Annarbour", the earliest known use of the town's name. The local Ojibwa named the settlement kaw-goosh-kaw-nick, after the sound of Allen's sawmill.

Ann Arbor became the seat of Washtenaw County in 1827, and was incorporated as a village in 1833. The Ann Arbor Land Company, a group of speculators, set aside  of undeveloped land and offered it to the state of Michigan as the site of the state capitol, but lost the bid to Lansing. In 1837, the property was accepted instead as the site of the University of Michigan.

Since the university's establishment in the city in 1837, the histories of the University of Michigan and Ann Arbor have been closely linked. The town became a regional transportation hub in 1839 with the arrival of the Michigan Central Railroad, and a north–south railway connecting Ann Arbor to Toledo and other markets to the south was established in 1878. Throughout the 1840s and the 1850s settlers continued to come to Ann Arbor. While the earlier settlers were primarily of British ancestry, the newer settlers also consisted of Germans, Irish, and Black people. In 1851, Ann Arbor was chartered as a city, though the city showed a drop in population during the Depression of 1873. It was not until the early 1880s that Ann Arbor again saw robust growth, with new emigrants from Greece, Italy, Russia, and Poland. Ann Arbor saw increased growth in manufacturing, particularly in milling. Ann Arbor's Jewish community also grew after the turn of the 20th century, and its first and oldest synagogue, Beth Israel Congregation, was established in 1916.

During the 1960s and 1970s, the city gained a reputation as an important center for liberal politics. Ann Arbor also became a locus for left-wing activism and anti-Vietnam War movement, as well as the student movement. The first major meetings of the national left-wing campus group Students for a Democratic Society took place in Ann Arbor in 1960; in 1965, the city was home to the first U.S. teach-in against the Vietnam War. During the ensuing 15 years, many countercultural and New Left enterprises sprang up and developed large constituencies within the city. These influences washed into municipal politics during the early and mid-1970s when three members of the Human Rights Party (HRP) won city council seats on the strength of the student vote. During their time on the council, HRP representatives fought for measures including pioneering antidiscrimination ordinances, measures decriminalizing marijuana possession, and a rent-control ordinance; many of these progressive organizations remain in effect today in modified form.

Two religious-conservative institutions were created in Ann Arbor; the Word of God (established in 1967), a charismatic inter-denominational movement; and the Thomas More Law Center (established in 1999).

Following a 1956 vote, the city of East Ann Arbor merged with Ann Arbor to encompass the eastern sections of the city.

In the past several decades, Ann Arbor has grappled with the effects of sharply rising land values, gentrification, and urban sprawl stretching into outlying countryside. On November 4, 2003, voters approved a greenbelt plan under which the city government bought development rights on agricultural parcels of land adjacent to Ann Arbor to preserve them from sprawling development. Since then, a vociferous local debate has hinged on how and whether to accommodate and guide development within city limits. Ann Arbor consistently ranks in the "top places to live" lists published by various mainstream media outlets every year. In 2008, it was ranked by CNNMoney.com 27th out of 100 "America's best small cities". And in 2010, Forbes listed Ann Arbor as one of the most liveable cities in the United States.

Geography and cityscape

Most of the water portion of the city is the Huron River.

Ann Arbor is  road miles west of Ypsilanti. Ann Arbor is also  road miles west of Detroit. Ann Arbor Charter Township adjoins the city's north and east sides. Ann Arbor is situated on the Huron River in a productive agricultural and fruit-growing region. The landscape of Ann Arbor consists of hills and valleys, with the terrain becoming steeper near the Huron River. Generally, the west-central and northwestern parts of the city and U-M's North Campus are the highest parts of the city; the lowest parts are along the Huron River and in the southeast.

Ann Arbor's "Tree Town" nickname stems from the dense forestation of its parks and residential areas. The city contains more than 50,000 trees along its streets and an equal number in parks. In recent years, the emerald ash borer has destroyed many of the city's approximately 10,500 ash trees. The city contains 157 municipal parks ranging from small neighborhood green spots to large recreation areas. Several large city parks and a university park border sections of the Huron River. Fuller Recreation Area, near the University Hospital complex, contains sports fields, pedestrian and bike paths, and swimming pools. The Nichols Arboretum, owned by the University of Michigan, is a  arboretum that contains hundreds of plant and tree species. It is on the city's east side, near the university's Central Campus. Located across the Huron River just beyond the university's North Campus is the university's Matthaei Botanical Gardens, which contains 300 acres of gardens and a large tropical conservatory as well as a wildflower garden specializing in the vegetation of the southern Great Lakes Region..

The Kerrytown Shops, Main Street Business District, the State Street Business District, and the South University Business District are commercial areas in downtown Ann Arbor. Three commercial areas south of downtown include the areas near I-94 and Ann Arbor-Saline Road, Briarwood Mall, and the South Industrial area. Other commercial areas include the Arborland/Washtenaw Avenue and Packard Road merchants on the east side, the Plymouth Road area in the northeast, and the Westgate/West Stadium areas on the west side. Downtown contains a mix of 19th- and early-20th-century structures and modern-style buildings, as well as a farmers' market in the Kerrytown district. The city's commercial districts are composed mostly of two- to four-story structures, although downtown and the area near Briarwood Mall contain a small number of high-rise buildings.

Ann Arbor's residential neighborhoods contain architectural styles ranging from classic 19th- and early 20th-century designs to ranch-style houses. Among these homes are a number of kit houses built in the early 20th century. Contemporary-style houses are farther from the downtown district. Surrounding the University of Michigan campus are houses and apartment complexes occupied primarily by student renters. Tower Plaza, a 26-story condominium building located between the University of Michigan campus and downtown, is the tallest building in Ann Arbor. The 19th-century buildings and streetscape of the Old West Side neighborhood have been preserved virtually intact; in 1972, the district was listed on the National Register of Historic Places, and it is further protected by city ordinances and a nonprofit preservation group.

Climate

Ann Arbor has a typically Midwestern humid continental climate (Köppen Dfa), which is influenced by the Great Lakes. Spring and autumn are transitional between the two. The area experiences lake effect weather, primarily in the form of increased cloudiness during late fall and early winter. Temperatures reach or exceed  on 10 days, and drop to or below  on 4.6 nights. Precipitation tends to be the heaviest during the summer months, but most frequent during winter.

Demographics

As of the 2020 U.S. Census, there were 123,851 people and 49,948 households residing in the city. The racial makeup of the city was 67.6% White, 6.8% Black, 0.2% Native American, 15.7% Asian, 0.1% Native Hawaiian or Pacific Islander, 1.8% from other races, and 7.9% from two or more races. Hispanic or Latino residents of any race made up 5.5% of the population. Ann Arbor has a small population of Arab Americans, including students as well as local Lebanese and Palestinians.

As of the 2010 U.S. Census, there were 113,934 people, 20,502 families, and 47,060 households residing in the city. The racial makeup of the city was 73.0% White (70.4% non-Hispanic White), 7.7% Black, 0.3% Native American, 14.4% Asian, 0.0% Native Hawaiian or Pacific Islander, 1.0% from other races, and 3.6% from two or more races. Hispanic or Latino residents of any race made up 4.1% of the population.

In 2013, Ann Arbor had the second-largest community of Japanese citizens in the state of Michigan, at 1,541; this figure trailed only that of Novi, which had 2,666 Japanese nationals.

In 2010, out of 47,060 households, 43.6% were family households, 20.1% had individuals under the age of 18 living in them, and 17.0% had individuals over age 65 living in them. Of the 20,502 family households, 19.2% included children under age 18, 34.2% were husband-wife families (estimates did not include same-sex married couples), and 7.1% had a female householder with no husband present. The average household size was 2.17 people, and the average family size was 2.85 people. The median age was 27.8; 14.4% of the population was under age 18, and 9.3% was age 65 or older.

According to the 2012–2016 American Community Survey estimates, the median household income was $57,697, and the median family income was $95,528. Males over age 25 and with earnings had a median income of $51,682, versus $39,203 for females. The per capita income for the city was $37,158. Nearly a quarter (23.4%) of people and 6.7% of families had incomes below the poverty level.

Economy
The University of Michigan shapes Ann Arbor's economy significantly. It employs about 30,000 workers, including about 12,000 in the medical center. Other employers are drawn to the area by the university's research and development money, and by its graduates. High tech, health services and biotechnology are other major components of the city's economy; numerous medical offices, laboratories, and associated companies are located in the city. Automobile manufacturers, such as General Motors and Visteon, also employ residents.

High tech companies have located in the area since the 1930s, when International Radio Corporation introduced the first mass-produced AC/DC radio (the Kadette, in 1931) as well as the first pocket radio (the Kadette Jr., in 1933). The Argus camera company, originally a subsidiary of International Radio, manufactured cameras in Ann Arbor from 1936 to the 1960s. Current firms include Arbor Networks (provider of Internet traffic engineering and security systems), Arbortext (provider of XML-based publishing software), JSTOR (the digital scholarly journal archive), MediaSpan (provider of software and online services for the media industries), Truven Health Analytics, and ProQuest, which includes UMI. Ann Arbor Terminals manufactured a video-display terminal called the Ann Arbor Ambassador during the 1980s. Barracuda Networks, which provides networking, security, and storage products based on network appliances and cloud services, opened an engineering office in Ann Arbor in 2008 on Depot St. and currently occupies the building previously used as the Borders headquarters on Maynard Street. Duo Security, a cloud-based access security provider protecting thousands of organizations worldwide through two-factor authentication, is headquartered in Ann Arbor. It was formerly a unicorn and continues to be headquartered in Ann Arbor after its acquisition by Cisco Systems. In November 2021, semiconductor test equipment company KLA Corporation opened a new North American headquarters in Ann Arbor.

Websites and online media companies in or near the city include All Media Guide, the Weather Underground, and Zattoo. Ann Arbor is the home to Internet2 and the Merit Network, a not-for-profit research and education computer network. Both are located in the South State Commons 2 building on South State Street, which once housed the Michigan Information Technology Center Foundation. The city is also home to a secondary office of Google's AdWords program—the company's primary revenue stream.  The recent surge in companies operating in Ann Arbor has led to a decrease in its office and flex space vacancy rates. As of December 31, 2012, the total market vacancy rate for office and flex space is 11.80%, a 1.40% decrease in vacancy from one year previous, and the lowest overall vacancy level since 2003. The office vacancy rate decreased to 10.65% in 2012 from 12.08% in 2011, while the flex vacancy rate decreased slightly more, with a drop from 16.50% to 15.02%.

As of 2022, Ann Arbor is home to more than twenty video game and XR studios of varying sizes. The city plays host to a regional chapter of the International Game Developers Association (IGDA) which hosts monthly meetups, presentations, and educational events.

Pfizer, once the city's second-largest employer, operated a large pharmaceutical research facility on the northeast side of Ann Arbor. On January 22, 2007, Pfizer announced it would close operations in Ann Arbor by the end of 2008. The facility was previously operated by Warner-Lambert and, before that, Parke-Davis. In December 2008, the University of Michigan Board of Regents approved the purchase of the facilities, and the university anticipates hiring 2,000 researchers and staff during the next 10 years. It is now known as North Campus Research Complex. The city is the home of other research and engineering centers, including those of Lotus Engineering, General Dynamics and the National Oceanic and Atmospheric Administration (NOAA). Other research centers sited in the city are the United States Environmental Protection Agency's National Vehicle and Fuel Emissions Laboratory and the Toyota Technical Center. The city is also home to National Sanitation Foundation International (NSF International), the nonprofit non-governmental organization that develops generally accepted standards for a variety of public health related industries and subject areas.

Borders Books, started in Ann Arbor, was opened by brothers Tom and Louis Borders in 1971 with a stock of used books. The Borders chain was based in the city, as was its flagship store until it closed in September 2011. Domino's Pizza's headquarters is near Ann Arbor on Domino's Farms, a  Frank Lloyd Wright-inspired complex just northeast of the city. Another Ann Arbor-based company is Zingerman's Delicatessen, which serves sandwiches and has developed businesses under a variety of brand names. Zingerman's has grown into a family of companies which offers a variety of products (bake shop, mail order, creamery, coffee) and services (business education). Flint Ink Corp., another Ann Arbor-based company, was the world's largest privately held ink manufacturer until it was acquired by Stuttgart-based XSYS Print Solutions in October 2005. Avfuel, a global supplier of aviation fuels and services, is also headquartered in Ann Arbor. Aastrom Biosciences, a publicly traded company that develops stem cell treatments for cardiovascular diseases, is also headquartered in Ann Arbor.

Many cooperative enterprises were founded in the city; among those that remain are the People's Food Co-op and the Inter-Cooperative Council at the University of Michigan, a student housing cooperative founded in 1937. There are also three cohousing communities—Sunward, Great Oak, and Touchstone—located immediately to the west of the city limits.

Culture

Several performing arts groups and facilities are on the University of Michigan's campus, as are museums dedicated to art, archaeology, and natural history and sciences. Founded in 1879, the University Musical Society is an independent performing arts organization that presents over 60 events each year, bringing international artists in music, dance, and theater. Since 2001 Shakespeare in the Arb has presented one play by Shakespeare each June, in a large park near downtown. Regional and local performing arts groups not associated with the university include the Ann Arbor Civic Theatre, the Arbor Opera Theater, the Ann Arbor Symphony Orchestra, the Ann Arbor Ballet Theater, the Ann Arbor Civic Ballet (established in 1954 as Michigan's first chartered ballet company), The Ark, and Performance Network Theatre. Another unique piece of artistic expression in Ann Arbor is the fairy doors. These small portals are examples of installation art and can be found throughout the downtown area.

The Ann Arbor Hands-On Museum is located in a renovated and expanded historic downtown fire station. Multiple art galleries exist in the city, notably in the downtown area and around the University of Michigan campus. Aside from a large restaurant scene in the Main Street, South State Street, and South University Avenue areas, Ann Arbor ranks first among U.S. cities in the number of booksellers and books sold per capita. The Ann Arbor District Library maintains four branch outlets in addition to its main downtown building. The city is also home to the Gerald R. Ford Presidential Library.

Several annual events—many of them centered on performing and visual arts—draw visitors to Ann Arbor. One such event is the Ann Arbor Art Fairs, a set of four concurrent juried fairs held on downtown streets. Scheduled on Thursday through Sunday of the third week of July, the fairs draw upward of half a million visitors. Another is the Ann Arbor Film Festival, held during the third week of March, which receives more than 2,500 submissions annually from more than 40 countries and serves as one of a handful of Academy Award–qualifying festivals in the United States.

Ann Arbor has a long history of openness to marijuana, given Ann Arbor's decriminalization of cannabis, the large number of medical marijuana dispensaries in the city (one dispensary, called People's Co-op, was directly across the street from Michigan Stadium until zoning forced it to move one mile to the west), the large number of pro-marijuana residents, and the annual Hash Bash: an event that is held on the first Saturday of April. Until (at least) the successful passage of Michigan's medical marijuana law, the event had arguably strayed from its initial intent, although for years, a number of attendees have received serious legal responses due to marijuana use on University of Michigan property, which does not fall under the city's progressive and compassionate ticketing program.

Ann Arbor is a major center for college sports, most notably at the University of Michigan. Several well-known college sports facilities exist in the city, including Michigan Stadium, the largest American football stadium in the world and the third-largest stadium of any kind in the world. Michigan Stadium has a capacity of 107,601, with the final "extra" seat said to be reserved for and in honor of former athletic director and Hall of Fame football coach Fitz Crisler. The stadium was completed in 1927 and cost more than $950,000 to build. The stadium is colloquially known as "The Big House" due to its status as the largest American football stadium. Crisler Center and Yost Ice Arena play host to the school's basketball (both men's and women's) and ice hockey teams, respectively. Concordia University, a member of the NAIA, also fields sports teams.

Ann Arbor is represented in the NPSL by semi-pro soccer team AFC Ann Arbor, a club founded in 2014 who call themselves The Mighty Oak.

A person from Ann Arbor is called an "Ann Arborite", and many long-time residents call themselves "townies". The city itself is often called "A²" ("A-squared") or "A2" ("A two") or "AA", "The Deuce" (mainly by Chicagoans), and "Tree Town". With tongue-in-cheek reference to the city's liberal political leanings, some occasionally refer to Ann Arbor as "The People's Republic of Ann Arbor" or "25 square miles surrounded by reality", the latter phrase being adapted from Wisconsin Governor Lee Dreyfus's description of Madison, Wisconsin. In A Prairie Home Companion broadcast from Ann Arbor, Garrison Keillor described Ann Arbor as "a city where people discuss socialism, but only in the fanciest restaurants." Ann Arbor sometimes appears on citation indexes as an author, instead of a location, often with the academic degree MI, a misunderstanding of the abbreviation for Michigan.

In 2011 the popular funk group Vulfpeck was founded in a basement in Ann Arbor.

Law and government

Ann Arbor has a council-manager form of government. The City Council has 11 voting members: the mayor and 10 city council members. Two city council members are elected from each of the city's five wards. The mayor and council serve four-year terms. The mayor and one council member from each ward are elected in mid-term election years, and the other five council members are elected in the alternate even-numbered years. The mayor is elected citywide. Approved by City voters in November 2016, and effective with the mayoral election of November 2018, the term of office of mayor will be extended from two years to four years. The mayor is the presiding officer of the City Council and has the power to appoint all Council committee members as well as board and commission members, with the approval of the City Council. The current mayor of Ann Arbor is Christopher Taylor, a Democrat who was elected as mayor in 2014. Day-to-day city operations are managed by a city administrator chosen by the city council.

Ann Arbor holds mayoral elections to 4-year terms concurrent with the Gubernatorial election.

Until 2017, City Council held annual elections in which half of the seats (one from each ward) were elected to 2-year terms. These elections were staggered, with each ward having one of its seats up for election in odd years and its other seat up for election in even years. Beginning in 2018 the City Council has had staggered elections to 4-year terms in even years. This means that half of the members (one from each ward) are elected in presidential election years, while the other half are elected in mid-term election years. To facilitate this change in scheduling, the 2017 election elected members to terms that lasted 3-years.

In 1960, Ann Arbor voters approved a $2.3 million bond issue to build the current city hall, which was designed by architect Alden B. Dow. The City Hall opened in 1963. In 1995, the building was renamed the Guy C. Larcom, Jr. Municipal Building in honor of the longtime city administrator who championed the building's construction.

Ann Arbor is part of Michigan's 6th congressional district, represented in Congress by Representative Debbie Dingell, a Democrat. On the state level, the city is part of the 18th district in the Michigan Senate, represented by Democrat Rebekah Warren. In the Michigan House of Representatives, representation is split between the 55th district (northern Ann Arbor, part of Ann Arbor Township, and other surrounding areas, represented by Democrat Adam Zemke), the 53rd district (most of downtown and the southern half of the city, represented by Democrat Yousef Rabhi) and the 52nd district (southwestern areas outside Ann Arbor proper and western Washtenaw County, represented by Democrat Donna Lasinski).

As the county seat of Washtenaw County, the Washtenaw County Trial Court (22nd Circuit Court) is located in Ann Arbor at the Washtenaw County Courthouse on Main Street. This court has countywide general jurisdiction and has two divisions: the Civil/Criminal (criminal and civil matters) and the Family Division (which includes Juvenile Court, Friend of the Court, and Probate Court sections). Seven judges serve on the court.

Ann Arbor also has a local state district court (15th District Court), which serves only the City of Ann Arbor. In Michigan, the state district courts are limited jurisdiction courts that handle traffic violations, civil cases with claims under $25,000, landlord-tenant matters, and misdemeanor crimes.

The Ann Arbor Federal Building (attached to a post office) on Liberty Street serves as one of the courthouses for the U.S. District Court for the Eastern District of Michigan and Court of Appeals for the Sixth Circuit.

Politics
Progressive politics have been particularly strong in municipal government since the 1960s. Voters approved charter amendments that have lessened the penalties for possession of marijuana (1974), and that aim to protect access to abortion in the city should it ever become illegal in the State of Michigan (1990). In 1974, Kathy Kozachenko's victory in an Ann Arbor city-council race made her the country's first openly homosexual candidate to win public office. In 1975, Ann Arbor became the first U.S. city to use instant-runoff voting for a mayoral race. Adopted through a ballot initiative sponsored by the local Human Rights Party, which feared a splintering of the liberal vote, the process was repealed in 1976 after use in only one election. As of April 2021, Democrats hold the mayorship and all ten council seats. Nationally, Ann Arbor is located in Michigan's 12th congressional district, represented by Democrat Debbie Dingell.

Crime

In 2015, Ann Arbor was ranked 11th safest among cities in Michigan with a population of over 50,000. It ranked safer than cities such as Royal Oak, Livonia, Canton and Clinton Township. The level of most crimes in Ann Arbor has fallen significantly in the past 20 years. In 1995 there were 294 aggravated assaults, 132 robberies and 43 rapes while in 2015 there were 128 aggravated assaults, 42 robberies and 58 rapes (under the revised definition).

Ann Arbor's crime rate was below the national average in 2000. The violent crime rate was further below the national average than the property crime rate; the two rates were 48% and 11% lower than the U.S. average, respectively.

Education

Primary and secondary education
Public schools are part of the Ann Arbor Public Schools (AAPS) district. AAPS has one of the country's leading music programs. In September 2008, 16,539 students had been enrolled in the Ann Arbor Public Schools. Notable schools include Pioneer, Huron, Skyline, and Community high schools, and Ann Arbor Open School. The district has a preschool center with both free and tuition-based programs for preschoolers in the district. The University High School, a "demonstration school" with teachers drawn from the University of Michigan's education program, was part of the school system from 1924 to 1968.

Ann Arbor is home to several private schools, including Emerson School, the Father Gabriel Richard High School, Rudolf Steiner School of Ann Arbor, Clonlara School, Michigan Islamic Academy, and Greenhills School, a prep school. The city is also home to several charter schools such as Central Academy (Michigan) (PreK-12) of the Global Educational Excellence (GEE) charter school company, Washtenaw Technical Middle College, and Honey Creek Community School.

Higher education

The University of Michigan dominates the city of Ann Arbor, providing the city with its distinctive college-town character. University buildings are located in the center of the city and the campus is directly adjacent to the State Street and South University downtown areas.

Other local colleges and universities include Concordia University Ann Arbor, a Lutheran liberal-arts institution, and Cleary University, a private business school. Washtenaw Community College is located in neighboring Ann Arbor Township. In 2000, the Ave Maria School of Law, a Roman Catholic law school established by Domino's Pizza founder Tom Monaghan, opened in northeastern Ann Arbor, but the school moved to Ave Maria, Florida in 2009, and the Thomas M. Cooley Law School acquired the former Ave Maria buildings for use as a branch campus.

Media

The Ann Arbor News, owned by the Michigan-based Booth Newspapers chain, was the major newspaper serving Ann Arbor and the rest of Washtenaw County. The newspaper ended its 174-year daily print run in 2009, due to economic difficulties and began producing two printed editions a week under the name AnnArbor.com, It resumed using its former name in 2013.  It also produces a daily digital edition named Mlive.com. Another Ann Arbor-based publication that has ceased production was the Ann Arbor Paper, a free monthly. Ann Arbor has been said to be the first significant city to lose its only daily paper. The Ann Arbor Chronicle, an online newspaper, covered local news, including meetings of the library board, county commission, and DDA until September 3, 2014.

Current publications in the city include the Ann Arbor Journal (A2 Journal), a weekly community newspaper; the Ann Arbor Observer, a free monthly local magazine; and Current, a free entertainment-focused alt-weekly. The Ann Arbor Business Review covers local business in the area. Car and Driver magazine and Automobile Magazine are also based in Ann Arbor. The University of Michigan is served by many student publications, including the independent Michigan Daily student newspaper, which reports on local, state, and regional issues in addition to campus news.

Four major AM radio stations based in or near Ann Arbor are WAAM 1600, a conservative news and talk station; WLBY 1290, a business news and talk station; WDEO 990, Catholic radio; and WTKA 1050, which is primarily a sports station. The city's FM stations include NPR affiliate WUOM 91.7; country station WWWW 102.9; and adult-alternative station WQKL 107.1. Freeform station WCBN-FM 88.3 is a local community radio/college radio station operated by the students of the University of Michigan featuring noncommercial, eclectic music and public-affairs programming. The city is also served by public and commercial radio broadcasters in Ypsilanti, the Lansing/Jackson area, Detroit, Windsor, and Toledo.

Ann Arbor is part of the Detroit television market. WPXD channel 31, the owned-and-operated Detroit outlet of the ION Television network, is licensed to the city. Until its sign-off on August 31, 2017, WHTV channel 18, a MyNetworkTV-affiliated station for the Lansing market, was broadcast from a transmitter in Lyndon Township, west of Ann Arbor. Community Television Network (CTN) is a city-provided cable television channel with production facilities open to city residents and nonprofit organizations. Detroit and Toledo-area radio and television stations also serve Ann Arbor, and stations from Lansing and Windsor, Ontario, can be seen in parts of the area.

Health, environment, and utilities

The University of Michigan Medical Center, the only teaching hospital in the city, took the number 1 slot in U.S. News & World Report for best hospital in the state of Michigan, as of 2015. The University of Michigan Health System (UMHS) includes University Hospital, C.S. Mott Children's Hospital and Women's Hospital in its core complex. UMHS also operates out-patient clinics and facilities throughout the city. The area's other major medical centers include a large facility operated by the Department of Veterans Affairs in Ann Arbor, and Saint Joseph Mercy Hospital in nearby Superior Township.

The city provides sewage disposal and water supply services, with water coming from the Huron River and groundwater sources. There are two water-treatment plants, one main and three outlying reservoirs, four pump stations, and two water towers. These facilities serve the city, which is divided into five water districts. The city's water department also operates four dams along the Huron River—Argo, Barton, Geddes, and Superior—of which Barton and Superior provide hydroelectric power. The city also offers waste management services, with Recycle Ann Arbor handling recycling service. Other utilities are provided by private entities. Electrical power and gas are provided by DTE Energy. AT&T Inc. is the primary wired telephone service provider for the area. Cable TV service is primarily provided by Comcast.

A plume of the industrial solvent dioxane is migrating under the city from the contaminated Gelman Sciences, Inc. property on the westside of Ann Arbor.    It's currently detected at 0.039 ppb. The Gelman plume is a potential threat to one of the City of Ann Arbor's drinking water sources, the Huron River, which flows through downtown Ann Arbor.

Transportation

Surface roads and paths
The streets in downtown Ann Arbor conform to a grid pattern, though this pattern is less common in the surrounding areas. Major roads branch out from the downtown district like spokes on a wheel to the highways surrounding the city. The city is belted by three freeways: I-94, which runs along the southern and western portion of the city; U.S. Highway 23 (US 23), which primarily runs along the eastern edge of Ann Arbor; and M-14, which runs along the northern edge of the city. Other nearby highways include US 12 (Michigan Ave.), M-17 (Washtenaw Ave.), and M-153 (Ford Rd.). Several of the major surface arteries lead to the I-94/M-14 interchange in the west, US 23 in the east, and the city's southern areas. The city also has a system of bike routes and paths and includes the nearly complete Washtenaw County Border-to-Border Trail.

Bus service
The Ann Arbor Area Transportation Authority (AAATA), which brands itself as "TheRide", operates public bus services throughout the city and nearby Ypsilanti. The AATA operates Blake Transit Center on Fourth Ave. in downtown Ann Arbor, and the Ypsilanti Transit Center. A separate zero-fare bus service operates within and between the University of Michigan campuses.  Since April 2012, route 98 (the "AirRide") connects to Detroit Metro Airport a dozen times a day. There are also limited-stop bus services between Ann Arbor and Chelsea as well as Canton. These two routes, 91 and 92 respectively, are known as the "ExpressRide".

Greyhound Lines provides intercity bus service. The Michigan Flyer, a service operated by Indian Trails, cooperates with AAATA for their AirRide and additionally offers bus service to East Lansing. Megabus has direct service to Chicago, Illinois, while a bus service is provided by Amtrak for rail passengers making connections to services in East Lansing and Toledo, Ohio.

Airports
Ann Arbor Municipal Airport is a small, city-run general aviation airport located south of I-94. Willow Run Airport east of the city near Ypsilanti serves freight, corporate, and general aviation clients.

Railroads

The city was a major rail hub, notably for freight traffic between Toledo and ports north of Chicago, Illinois, from 1878 to 1982; however, the Ann Arbor Railroad also provided passenger service from 1878 to 1950, going northwest to Frankfort and Elberta on Lake Michigan and southeast to Toledo. (In Elberta connections to ferries across the Lake could be made.) The city was served by the Michigan Central Railroad starting in 1837. The Ann Arbor and Ypsilanti Street Railway, Michigan's first interurban, served the city from 1891 to 1929.

Amtrak, which provides service to the city at the Ann Arbor Train Station, operates the Wolverine train between Chicago and Pontiac, via Detroit. The present-day train station neighbors the city's old Michigan Central Depot, which was renovated as a restaurant in 1970.

Sister cities

Ann Arbor has seven sister cities:
 Tübingen, Baden-Württemberg, Germany (since 1965) The schools in Ann Arbor and Tübingen have regular exchanges.
Belize City, Belize (since 1967)
 Hikone, Shiga, Japan (since 1969) The schools in Ann Arbor and Hikone have regular exchanges.
 Peterborough, Ontario, Canada (since 1983)
 Juigalpa, Chontales, Nicaragua (since 1986)
 Dakar, Senegal (since 1997)
 Remedios, Cuba (since 2003)

See also

 Ann Arbor staging
 Ardis Publishing
 List of people from Ann Arbor
 Metro Detroit

Notes

References

Works cited

Further reading

External links

 City's official website
 Ann Arbor Area Convention and Visitor's Bureau
Collection: "Ann Arbor and the University of Michigan" from the University of Michigan Museum of Art
Materials on Ann Arbor's history from HathiTrust

 
Populated places established in 1824
Academic enclaves
County seats in Michigan
Cities in Washtenaw County, Michigan
Metro Detroit
1824 establishments in Michigan Territory
Geographical articles missing image alternative text